Barbara Gay Williams  is a retired New Zealand nurse.

Biography 
Williams served as executive director of the New Zealand Nurses Organisation, and led negotiations on pay and working conditions for nurses.

Recognition 
In the 1991 New Year Honours, Williams was appointed a Companion of the Queen's Service Order for public services. In 1993 Williams was awarded a New Zealand Suffrage Centennial Medal. In the 2002 Queen's Birthday and Golden Jubilee Honours, she was made a Companion of the New Zealand Order of Merit, for services to nursing.

References 

New Zealand nurses
Companions of the New Zealand Order of Merit
Living people
Year of birth missing (living people)
Companions of the Queen's Service Order
Recipients of the New Zealand Suffrage Centennial Medal 1993
New Zealand justices of the peace